Rebecca Codd (born 25 April 1981) is an Irish-Australian professional golfer. She has played on the ALPG Tour and Ladies European Tour.

Amateur wins
1998 South Australian Junior Amateur Championship
2000 South Australian Ladies Amateur Championship, Irish Women's Open Stroke Play Championship
2001 South Australian Ladies Amateur Championship
2002 Irish Women's Amateur Close Championship, Irish Women's Open Stroke Play Championship

Professional
Codd turned professional in 2002. For the first few years, she only played in Australia where she won the 2003 Horizons ALPG Rookie of the Year. Since 2005, she also plays on the Ladies European Tour. There she has always been in the top-70 and thus has earned her playing right. She finished her first season ranked 23. She has achieved 13 top-10 places.

Her husband, Shane Codd, is also a golf professional. In 2010 he was the caddie for Becky Brewerton, although he also caddied for Laura Davies when she won the Hero Women's Indian Open in New Delhi in November 2010. He is also chairman of the Caddie's Association. On 10 January 2011, Shane and Rebecca married. They live in Carlow, Ireland.

Team appearances
Amateur
Junior Tasman Cup (representing Australia): 1999 (winners)
Tasman Cup (representing Australia): 2001 (winners)
Queen Sirikit Cup (representing Australia): 2002
Burtta Cheney Cup: 1999
Gladys Hay Memorial Cup: 1999, 2001, 2002

References

External links

Irish female golfers
Ladies European Tour golfers
ALPG Tour golfers
Irish people of Australian descent
Expatriate sportspeople in Australia
Sportspeople from Adelaide
Sportspeople from County Carlow
1981 births
Living people